Vértigo  is the fifth studio album by Spanish singer-songwriter Pablo Alborán.  It was released by Warner Music Spain on 11 December 2020. The album received nominations for a Grammy Award for Best Latin Pop Album and at the Latin Grammy Awards for Album of the Year and Best Traditional Pop Vocal Album.

Background and release
The album was released on December 11, 2020, though it was supposed to be released on November 6, 2020, but its release was delayed due to the second wave of the coronavirus in Spain. In an interview with El Comercio, Alborán stated that Vértigo "is an album where I have thrown myself more than ever because it is very sincere, because it comes at a time of vulnerability for everyone in this pandemic. It is an album that I have written between the last tour and this pandemic, so there is a mixture of emotions there. It is an album very faithful to my present too, and very loyal to how I feel."

Track listing

Charts

Weekly charts

Year-end charts

Certifications

References 

 
2020 albums
Pablo Alborán albums